Vice Admiral Suraj Berry, AVSM, NM, VSM is a serving Flag officer in the Indian Navy. He currently serves as the Controller Personnel Services. He previously served as Chief of Staff of the Andaman and Nicobar Command. He has also commanded the Eastern Fleet and was the Commissioning Commanding Officer of the aircraft carrier INS Vikramaditya.

Naval career 
Berry was commissioned in the Indian Navy on 1 January 1987. He is a specialist in Gunnery and Missile Warfare.

He has also served as the operations officer of a Mobile Missile Coastal Battery, and fleet gunnery officer of the Western Fleet.

Berry has commanded the Veer-class missile vessel , the Kora-class missile corvette , the Talwar-class stealth guided missile frigate , and the aircraft carrier , of which he was the commissioning commanding officer.

Berry has served as the defence advisor to the High Commissioner of India to Sri Lanka and Maldives. He had director positions at the Directorate of Staff Requirement and at Naval Headquarters. As a commodore, he served as naval advisor (NA) to the Chief of Naval Staff. He then served as the Principal Director Strategy, Concepts and Transformation at NHQ.

Flag rank
In October 2016, Berry was promoted to the rank of rear admiral and appointed Assistant Chief of Personnel (Human Resource Development (ACOP HRD) at Naval HQ. After a two-and-a-half year stint, he was appointed Flag Officer Commanding Eastern Fleet (FOCEF) on 30 March 2019. For his tenure as the FOCEF, he was awarded the Ati Vishisht Seva Medal on 26 January 2020. In February 2020, he moved to Port Blair as the Chief of Staff of the Andaman and Nicobar Command. On 2 August 2021, he was promoted to the rank of Vice Admiral and appointed Controller of Personnel Services (CPS) at NHQ, succeeding Vice Admiral Sanjay Jasjit Singh

Awards and decorations 
Berry is a recipient of the Vishist Seva Medal in 2006 (awarded to him for services during the tsunami relief operations in Sri Lanka and Maldives. He is also the recipient of the Nao Sena Medal in 2015 (awarded for devotion to duty). He was awarded the Ati Vishisht Seva Medal in 2020. He has also been awarded the Chief of Naval Staff Commendation card once and the FOC‑in‑C Western Naval Command commendation card twice.

Personal life
Berry is married to Kangana Berry. The couple have two children.

See also
 Eastern Fleet
 INS Vikramaditya

References 

Indian Navy admirals
Flag Officers Commanding Eastern Fleet
Recipients of the Vishisht Seva Medal
Year of birth missing (living people)
Living people
Recipients of the Ati Vishisht Seva Medal
Recipients of the Nau Sena Medal